is a Japanese professional basketball team in Kumamoto, Kumamoto. The team competes in the B.League. Volters hosted the B.League All-star Game in 2018.

Roster

Notable players
Paul Butorac
Josh Duinker
Joel James
Lamont Jones
Tshilidzi Nephawe
Jordan Vandenberg
DeVaughn Washington
Terrance Woodbury

Coaches
Norm deSilva (2013–14)
Shinji Tomiyama
Yoshinori Shimzu
Takayuki Yasuda
Nenad Vučinić
Osamu Okada (es)

Arenas
Kumamoto Prefectural Gymnasium
Minamata City General Gymnasium
ecowin Uto Arena
Koshi City General Gymnasium
Kikuchi City General Gymnasium
Tamana City General Gymnasium

References

External links

Weekly Volters

 
Basketball teams in Japan
Basketball teams established in 2012
2012 establishments in Japan
Sports teams in Kumamoto Prefecture